Leonard Henry Eicholtz (April 23, 1827 – January 3, 1911) was a leading 19th-century American railroad engineer and civil engineer.

Early life and career
Eicholtz was born in the city of Lancaster, Pennsylvania, April 23, 1827, being the oldest son of Henry and Elizabeth Eicholtz. The family was of German origin, his great grandfather, Jacob Eicholtz, leaving the Palatinate, Germany, and coming to Pennsylvania, where he settled in Lancaster county, in 1733. Eicholtz studied civil engineering at the Moravian Academy at Lititz, Lancaster county, Pennsylvania.

Pennsylvania railroad
In 1852, Eicholtz joined the corps of engineers working on the railroad until 1854 when he started working on the Philadelphia and Erie Railroad. Eicholtz remained on the project until the railroad experience financial problems due to the Panic of 1857. Eicholtz left the railroad at that time only to return in 1858.

Interoceanic Railway Company
In 1857, he went to Honduras, Central America to work with John C. Trautwine of Philadelphia who was chief engineer of a party surveying a line from the Atlantic to the Pacific Ocean for the Honduras Interoceanic Railway.

Kansas Pacific Railway
In 1866, Eicholtz left the military railroads and was a resident engineer of the Kansas Pacific Railway Company, with headquarters at Wyandotte, Kansas part of present-day Kansas City, Kansas. The US Congress had approved and Act on July 3, 1866, authorizing the railway to extend the railroad westward along the Smoky Hill River to Denver, Colorado. The Act also required the railroad to join the Union Pacific railroad no more than fifty miles west of Denver, a distance of 394 miles. The railroad was completed by the end of 1867.

Union Pacific Railway Company
In 1868, Eicholtz became superintendent of bridge-building and remained with the project until its completion at Promontory Point and the Golden Spike event on May 10, 1869. Eicholtz is in the Andrew J. Russell photograph titled "Engineers of U.P.R.R. at the Laying of Last Rail Promentory (sic).

Civil War
Soon after the beginning of the war with Fort Sumter, Eicholtz volunteered as an assistant engineer for military railroads in the Military Division of the Mississippi. Eicholtz worked to reconstruct railroads destroyed by the two armies during Sherman's campaign in Tennessee and Georgia and Sherman march from Chattanooga to Atlanta. Eicholtz left the Army in 1866 as acting chief engineer of military railroads of the Division of the Mississippi.

Family and death and
Eicholtz married Ellen Inslee Smith in 1871 and they had five children: four daughters and one son, Leonard H. Eicholtz, Jr. Eicholtz died on January 3, 1911, and was interred at Fairmount Cemetery in Denver, Colorado.

References
Books
 
Manuscript Collections
 Leonard H. Eicholtz Collection (MSS #1023), Colorado Historical Society, Denver, Colorado.
 Inventory of the Leonard Eicholtz diaries, 1838–1910, University of Wyoming. American Heritage Center. 
Sources

1827 births
1911 deaths
American railway civil engineers
People from Lancaster, Pennsylvania